Three ships of Stena Line have been named Stena Shipper.

Ship names